Médiouna is a province in the Moroccan region of Casablanca-Settat. Its population in 2004 was 122,851.

Subdivisions
The province is divided administratively into the following:

References

 
Médiouna
Geography of Casablanca-Settat